Viktor Zuikov (born 10 April 1962) is an Estonian fencer. He competed in the individual épée event at the 1992 Summer Olympics.

References

External links
 

1962 births
Living people
Estonian male épée fencers
Olympic fencers of Estonia
Fencers at the 1992 Summer Olympics
Sportspeople from Tartu
Estonian people of Russian descent
20th-century Estonian people
21st-century Estonian people